Hoting is a locality situated in Tåsjö parish, Strömsund Municipality, Jämtland County, Sweden with 667 inhabitants in 2010. Hoting was mentioned in documents regarding Sweden/Norway border rulings in 1273.

Climate
Hoting has a subarctic climate. Located in northern Jämtland at a great distance from both the Atlantic and the Bothnian seas, it has a more continental climate than the regional seat Östersund, leading to warmer summers in spite of the higher latitude. Winters are cold by Swedish standards for the latitude due to being located at a distance from both the North Atlantic and the Bothnian Bay.

References 

Populated places in Strömsund Municipality
Ångermanland